Requiem for a Dream is a 2000 American psychological drama film directed by Darren Aronofsky and starring Ellen Burstyn, Jared Leto, Jennifer Connelly, Christopher McDonald, and Marlon Wayans. It is based on the 1978 novel of the same name by Hubert Selby Jr., with whom Aronofsky wrote the screenplay. The film depicts four characters affected by drug addiction and how it alters their physical and emotional states. Their addictions cause them to become imprisoned in a world of delusion and desperation. As the film progresses, each character deteriorates, and their reality is overtaken by delusion, resulting in catastrophe.

Selby's novel was optioned by Aronofsky and producer Eric Watson. Selby had always intended to adapt the novel into a film, as he had written a script years prior to Aronofsky approaching him. Aronofsky was enthusiastic about the story and developed the script with Selby, despite initial struggles to obtain funding for the film's production. He and the cast speak of the film being about addictions in general, and not just drugs, with a theme of loneliness and avoidance of reality in different ways.

The film premiered at the 2000 Cannes Film Festival, selected as an out-of-competition entry, followed by the United States theatrical release on October 6, 2000, by Artisan Entertainment. It received a positive response from critics despite not doing well at the box office. The film's visual style, direction, screenplay, editing, musical score, cast, and themes were all praised, with Burstyn receiving an Academy Award nomination for Best Actress. The soundtrack was composed by Clint Mansell.

Plot
Sara Goldfarb, a widow who lives alone in a Brighton Beach apartment, spends her time watching television. Her son Harry is a heroin addict, along with his friend Tyrone and girlfriend Marion. The three deal heroin in a bid to realize their dreams; Harry and Marion plan to open a clothing store for Marion's designs, while Tyrone seeks the approval of his mother and an escape from the ghetto. When Sara receives a call that she has been invited to appear on her favorite game show, she begins a restrictive crash diet in an attempt to fit into a red dress that she wore at Harry's graduation.

At the advice of her friend Rae, Sara visits a physician who prescribes her amphetamines to control her appetite. She begins losing weight rapidly and is excited by how much energy she has. When Harry recognizes the signs of her drug abuse and implores her to stop taking the amphetamines, Sara insists that the chance to appear on television and the increased admiration from her friends Ada and Rae are her remaining reasons to live. As time passes Sara becomes frantic waiting for the invitation and increases her dosage, which causes her to develop amphetamine psychosis.

Tyrone is caught in a shootout between drug traffickers and the Sicilian Mafia and is arrested despite his innocence. Harry has to use most of their saved money to post bail. As a result of the gang warfare, the local supply of heroin becomes restricted, and they are unable to find any to buy. Eventually, Tyrone hears of a large shipment coming to New York from Florida, but the price has doubled and the minimum purchase risk is high. Harry encourages Marion to engage in sex work, particularly with her psychiatrist, Arnold, as a client. This request, along with their mounting withdrawal symptoms, strains their relationship.

Sara's increased dosage of amphetamines distorts her sense of reality, and she begins to hallucinate that she is mocked by the host and crowd from the television show, and attacked by her refrigerator. Sara flees her apartment and goes to the casting agency office in Manhattan to confirm when she will be on television. Sara's disturbed state causes her to be admitted to a psychiatric ward, where she fails to respond to various medications. She undergoes electroconvulsive therapy instead. After the heroin shipment descends into a melee, Harry and Tyrone travel to Miami to buy heroin directly from the wholesaler. However, Harry's arm has become gangrenous from heroin use, so the two stop at a hospital. The doctor realizes that Harry is a drug addict and calls the police, resulting in Harry and Tyrone being arrested.

Back in New York City, a desperate Marion begins to work for a pimp, Big Tim, and is sexually assaulted by a large group. Sara's treatment leaves her in a dissociated catatonic near-vegetative state, to the horror of her friends Ada and Rae, who weep and try to comfort each other on a park bench outside the hospital. Harry's arm is amputated above the elbow, and he breaks down in tears after he realizes Marion will not visit him. Tyrone is subjected to grueling labor and psychological abuse from the racist prison guards, all while experiencing a painful heroin withdrawal. Marion returns home and lies on her sofa, clutching her score of heroin and surrounded by her crumpled and discarded clothing designs. Each of the four characters curl into a fetal position. Sara imagines herself as the beautiful game show winner, with Harry—married and successful—arriving as a guest. Sara and Harry lovingly embrace.

Cast

Production

Development

The novel Requiem for a Dream by Hubert Selby Jr. was published in 1978. Aronofsky had been a fan of Selby's work during his school years. In a 2001 interview with the BBC, Aronofsky described Selby's work, saying "Anyone that reads Selby's work can see how intense his world is. He writes the most discordant, angry words that tickle the air with some sweet music around it. It's an unbelievable experience to read his books. I knew that once I made a larger film it would be very difficult to do a project like this. I live my life not wanting to have any regrets, and I knew that Selby was cool, that he's a badass".

Eric Watson, producer and co-writer of Pi (1998),convinced Aronofsky to adapt the novel into a film. Selby was open to the idea and granted permission. Aronofsky and Watson optioned the film rights for $1,000, which was considered a large sum for them at the time. Aronofsky was still struggling financially after Pi, and financiers were also unconvinced on his idea of Requiem for a Dream. A screenplay had been written by Selby years prior, which was 80% similar to Aronofsky's. The pair compared their works, but Aronofsky wanted to cast younger characters to enhance the impact of drugs. However, the producers were against hiring a younger cast as they felt the film would be too unsettling for audiences; the director reluctantly agreed.

Casting
A number of actresses were considered for the role of Sara Goldfarb, but many of them rejected the part. Faye Dunaway turned it down. Ellen Burstyn also initially rejected the part due to the depressing content, but her manager convinced her to see Aronofsky's previous work; she was impressed and agreed to be cast in the lead role. Giovanni Ribisi, Neve Campbell and Dave Chappelle were considered for the roles of Harry Goldfarb, Marion Silver and Tyrone C. Love, respectively. All three declined. The producers settled with Jared Leto, who was keen on the challenge, followed by Jennifer Connelly. "When I read the script, it was really something I wanted to do. I thought the script was brilliant. It was so creative. I thought it was really brave. It was talking about really important issues", she said. Marlon Wayans read the novel three times and auditioned five times for the role of Tyrone before he was offered the part, eager to work with the director.

In preparation for filming, Leto spent time living on the streets of New York, surrounded by people who were in the same situation as his character. He also starved himself for months, losing  to play his heroin-addicted character realistically. Aronofsky requested that Leto and Wayans refrain from having sex and consuming sugar so that their cravings would appear genuine on-screen. Burstyn also spent time in Brooklyn, learning about the lives of particular women, and how narrow they were. "Their life is about getting enough money to put food on the table to feed their children, and that's it", she said. Connelly prepared for the role by renting an apartment in the building where the character lived. Connelly isolated herself, painted, listened to music that she thought Marion would, designed clothes, and used the time to reflect about addictions and their origin. She also talked to addicts and attended Narcotics Anonymous meetings with a recovering friend.

Filming
Filming lasted 40 days, on location in and around Coney Island, including the boardwalk, amusement parks and Brighton Beach. To capture Sara Goldfarb's weight loss throughout the film, Burstyn wore two fat suits; one simulated an additional  in weight and one . Burstyn also dieted during a two-week break in the filming schedule, allowing her to lose . Makeup artists designed nine wigs and four necks for her, with some of the prosthetic pieces taking up to four hours to apply. Connelly's wardrobe consisted of pieces that she had made during her time preparing for the role.
During a grocery store scene, real drug addicts were brought in as extras. Aronofsky has recalled that some were injecting themselves during filming. One bathtub scene was inspired by Satoshi Kon's 1997 anime film Perfect Blue. Post-production also included approximately 150 special effects, created by Amoeba Proteus, a digital effects company formed by Aronofsky and his friends. After filming was completed, Burstyn said, "I don't think I've ever been this challenged in a role—it was harder than The Exorcist". Connelly also spoke of how "it was hard, really hard to go through, emotionally. It was draining, sad, and uncomfortable".

Editing
As with Aronofsky's previous film, Pi, montages of extremely short shots were used throughout the film; such techniques are sometimes referred to as hip hop montage but are also employed in traditional cinema, such as Man with a Movie Camera. While an average 100-minute film has 600 to 700 cuts, Requiem for a Dream features more than 2,000. Split-screen is used extensively, along with extremely tight close-ups. Long tracking shots, including shots where the camera is strapped to an actor and facing them, known as Snorricam, and time-lapse photography are also prominent stylistic devices.

Aronofsky alternates between extreme close-ups and extreme distance from the action, with sharp cuts between reality and characters' fantasies. The camerawork forces the viewer to explore the characters' states of mind, hallucinations, visual distortions, and inaccurate sense of time. The average length of scenes also shortens as the film progresses, from around 90 seconds to 2 minutes in the beginning, until the climactic scenes, which are cut very rapidly accompanied by incidental music. After the climax, there is a short period of silence and serenity. Pixelation and a fish-eye lens are also techniques used to help reinforce the effect of drugs and the viewer's distance from the character.

Reception

Box office
Requiem for a Dream premiered at the 2000 Cannes Film Festival on May 14, 2000, and the 2000 Toronto International Film Festival on September 13 before a wide release a month later. In the United States, the film opened on October 6, 2000, and grossed a total of $3,635,482, averaging $64,770 per theater. In other territories, the film earned $3,754,626, bringing a worldwide total of $7,390,108.

Rating
In the United States, the film was originally rated NC-17 by the Motion Picture Association of America, but Aronofsky appealed the rating, claiming that cutting any portion of the film would dilute its message. The appeal was denied, and Artisan Entertainment decided to release the film unrated. An R-rated version was released on video, with the sex scene edited, but the rest of the film identical to the unrated version.

In the United Kingdom, the film is rated 18 by the British Board of Film Classification.

Critical response

On Rotten Tomatoes Requiem for a Dream has an approval rating of 79% based on 138 reviews, with an average score of 7.40/10. The critical consensus states, "Though the movie may be too intense for some to stomach, the wonderful performances and the bleak imagery are hard to forget." On Metacritic the film has a weighted average score of 71 out of 100 based on 32 critics, indicating "generally favorable reviews."

Film critic James Berardinelli considered Requiem for a Dream the second-best film of the decade, behind The Lord of the Rings film trilogy. Roger Ebert gave the film 3 out of four stars, stating, "What is fascinating about Requiem for a Dream ... is how well [Aronofsky] portrays the mental states of his addicts. When they use, a window opens briefly into a world where everything is right. Then it slides shut, and life reduces itself to a search for the money and drugs to open it again". Elvis Mitchell, writing for The New York Times, gave the film a positive review, stating, "After the young director's phenomenal debut with the barely budgeted Pi, which was like watching a middleweight boxer win a fight purely on reflexes, he comes back with a picture that shows maturation".

Peter Bradshaw of The Guardian, lauded the film as an "agonising and unflinchingly grim portrait of drug abuse" and "a formally pleasing piece of work—if pleasing can possibly be the right word". Peter Travers of Rolling Stone wrote that "no one interested in the power and magic of movies should miss it". Owen Gleiberman of Entertainment Weekly, who gave the work an "A" grade, argued that it "may be the first movie to fully capture the way drugs dislocate us from ourselves" and said, "The movie, a full-throttle mind-bender, is hypnotically harrowing and intense, a visual and spiritual plunge into the seduction and terror of drug addiction". Scott Brake of IGN gave the film a 9.0 out of 10 and argued, "The reason it works so well as a film about addiction is that, in every frame, the film itself is addictive. It's absolutely relentless, from Aronofsky's bravura cinematic techniques (split screens, complex cross-cutting schemes, hallucinatory visuals) to Clint Mansell's driving, hypnotic score (performed by the Kronos Quartet), the movie compels you to watch it".

However, some critics had a less positive response. Dessen Howe of The Washington Post opined that the characters are "mostly relegated to human mannequins in Aronofsky's visual schemes", but praised Burstyn's performance. David Sterritt of the Christian Science Monitor wrote, "the filmmaking gets addicted to its own flashy cynicism ... the picture sometimes seems as dazed and confused as the situations it wants to criticize". William Arnold, writing for Seattle Post-Intelligencer, stated, "Aronofsky hurls the full grammar of the cinema at us like a film student on an adrenaline rush: slow-motion, fast-forward, jump cuts, surreal fantasy sequences, endless glaring close-ups of dilating pupils, bizarre hand-held tracking shots through the mean streets". Arnold compliments the filmmaker's style but thought the editing was "brutalizing and counterproductive".

Some critics characterize Requiem for a Dream in the genre of "drug movies", along with films such as The Basketball Diaries, Trainspotting, Spun, and Fear and Loathing in Las Vegas.

Accolades

 In 2007, Requiem for a Dream was listed on the ballot for the American Film Institute's list of AFI's 100 Years...100 Movies (10th Anniversary Edition).
 In a 2016 international critics' poll conducted by the BBC, Requiem for a Dream was tied with Toni Erdmann (2016) and Carlos (2010) at 100th place in a list of the 100 greatest motion pictures since 2000.
 The film was listed as the 29th best-edited film of all time in a 2012 survey by members of the Motion Picture Editors Guild.

Soundtrack

The soundtrack was composed by Clint Mansell. The string quartet arrangements were written by Pulitzer Prize-winning composer David Lang, and was performed by the Kronos Quartet. The soundtrack was re-released with the album Requiem for a Dream: Remixed, which contains remixes of the music by various artists including Paul Oakenfold, Josh Wink, Jagz Kooner, and Delerium. The track "Lux Aeterna" is an orchestral composition by Mansell, the leitmotif of Requiem for a Dream, and the penultimate piece in the film's soundtrack. The popularity of this piece led to its use in popular culture outside the film, in film and teaser trailers, and with multiple remixes and remakes by other producers.

Notes

References

External links

 
 
 
 
 

 
2000 drama films
2000 films
2000 independent films
2000s psychological drama films
American independent films
American psychological drama films
2000s English-language films
Films directed by Darren Aronofsky
Films about heroin addiction
Films about the illegal drug trade
Films about drugs
Films about prostitution in the United States
Rating controversies in film
Films based on American novels
Films based on works by Hubert Selby Jr.
Films set in Brooklyn
Films shot in New York City
Artisan Entertainment films
Films with screenplays by Darren Aronofsky
Films scored by Clint Mansell
Films set in apartment buildings
Films set in psychiatric hospitals
Articles containing video clips
Films about television
Protozoa Pictures films
2000s American films